William Strode (1598–1645), son of William Strode (1562–1637), was an English politician and MP, and one of the "Five Members".

William Strode may also refer to:

William Strode (1562–1637), of Newnham, Devon, English landowner, military engineer and MP 1597–1626
William Strode (of Barrington) (1589–1666), English Parliamentarian officer and MP for Ilchester 1640, 1646
William Strode (poet) (c.1602 – 1645), English poet
William Strode (1614–1676), of Newnham, Devon, English landowner and MP (1660–1676)
William Strode (died 1755), English MP for Reading
William Strode (1738–1809), English MP for Yarmouth, son of William Strode (died 1755)
William Strode (British Army officer) (1698–1776), Colonel in Chief of the Wiltshire Regiment
William Strode III (of Barrington) (1622–1694), MP for Ilchester 1679, son of William Strode (of Barrington)
Bill Strode (William Hall Strode III, 1937–2006), American photographer